Naked Hearts may refer to:
 Naked Hearts (1966 film), a French drama film
 Naked Hearts (1916 film), an American silent drama film